The 1926 SIAA men's basketball tournament took place March 3–March 6, 1927, at Greenville. The Mississippi College Choctaws won their first Southern Intercollegiate Athletic Association title, led by head coach George Bohler.

Bracket

Consolation game

Championship

See also
List of SIAA basketball champions

References

Tournament
Southern Intercollegiate men's basketball tournament
Southern Intercollegiate men's basketball tournament